Saint-Loup-en-Comminges (literally Saint-Loup in Comminges) is a commune in the Haute-Garonne department in southwestern France.

Geography
The river Gesse flows east-northeast through the southeastern part of the commune and forms part of its eastern border.

Population

See also
Communes of the Haute-Garonne department

References

Communes of Haute-Garonne
Comminges